Poullaouen is a commune in the Finistère department of Brittany in north-western France. On 1 January 2019, the former commune Locmaria-Berrien was merged into Poullaouen.

Population
Inhabitants of Poullaouen are called in French Poullaouenais.

See also
Communes of the Finistère department

References

External links

Official website

Mayors of Finistère Association 

Communes of Finistère

Communes nouvelles of Finistère